Celine Lee Xin Yi (born 30 June 1994) is a Malaysian karateka. She won the gold medal in the women's individual kata event at the 2017 Southeast Asian Games in Kuala Lumpur, Malaysia.

She won one of the bronze medals in the women's individual kata event at the 2013 Islamic Solidarity Games held in Palembang, Indonesia.

At the 2018 Asian Karate Championships held in Amman, Jordan, she won the silver medal in the women's kata event. In 2018, she also represented Malaysia at the Asian Games in the women's kata event where she was eliminated in her second match by Monsicha Tararattanakul of Thailand. In the same year, she also competed in the women's individual kata event at the World Karate Championships held in Madrid, Spain.

References

External links 
 

Living people
1994 births
Place of birth missing (living people)
Malaysian female karateka
Karateka at the 2018 Asian Games
Asian Games competitors for Malaysia
Southeast Asian Games gold medalists for Malaysia
Southeast Asian Games silver medalists for Malaysia
Southeast Asian Games bronze medalists for Malaysia
Southeast Asian Games medalists in karate
Competitors at the 2011 Southeast Asian Games
Competitors at the 2013 Southeast Asian Games
Competitors at the 2017 Southeast Asian Games
Competitors at the 2019 Southeast Asian Games
Islamic Solidarity Games medalists in karate
Islamic Solidarity Games competitors for Malaysia
21st-century Malaysian women